Tugiyo (born 13 April 1977) is a retired Indonesian football player. Tugiyo was born at Purwodadi, Central Java. Tugiyo was called "Maradona from Purwodadi" because he was a pacy striker and has sturdy, plump body like Diego Maradona.

Honours 
Club
 Champions of Liga Indonesia 1999 with PSIS
 Champions of 1st Division Liga Indonesia 2002–2003 with PSIS
National
 Champions of Asian Students Cup with Indonesia U-16 National Team

References 

Indonesian footballers
1977 births
Living people
Association football forwards
PSB Bogor players
PSIS Semarang players
Persipur Purwodadi players
Pesik Kuningan players
People from Grobogan Regency
Sportspeople from Central Java